Trashy Lingerie is a Los Angeles based custom-made lingerie apparel store. It is known for its unique designs and its association with Hollywood celebrities. Trashy Lingerie is well-known for requiring an annual $2 USD membership fee in order to shop in the store.

History
Trashy Lingerie was founded in 1973 by a local Shoe Designer, Mitch Shrier, and his wife Tracy. The store was named after a sling-back shoe called the “Trashy”, and initially specialised in footwear. The Shriers entered the lingerie business by hand-dying stockings in bright colors. By 1979, the store shifted to selling lingerie entirely. The company developed a full line of lingerie resulting in offering of over 8,000 products including lingerie, costumes, and bathing suits. All of the Trashy Lingerie designs are original, handmade and personally customisable. The company went online in 1998. Trashy Lingerie and its sister companies, Trashy.com and Trashy Girls, are owned and operated by Mitch Shrier, Randy Shrier, and Mary Loomis-Shrier respectively.

Media 
Trashy's designs have been seen in over 500 films, television shows, commercials, concert tours, music videos and hundreds of magazine features. The shop has been featured several times in the hit show The Girls Next Door where Hugh Hefner's then girlfriends bought their costumes for numerous Playboy Mansion parties.

The exterior of the store was featured in The Go-Go's music video for Our Lips Are Sealed.  Gene Simmons selected it as the shooting location for his interviews in the documentary film The Decline of Western Civilization Part II: The Metal Years.

The glamour and erotic photographer Ken Marcus featured Trashy Lingerie's designs in many of his centerfold shoots for Playboy and Penthouse magazines.

Media personality and retired decathlete Caitlyn Jenner wore a Trashy Lingerie corset on the June 2016 issue of Vanity Fair shot by Annie Liebowitz. This was her first media appearance after her gender transition.

Notable models and celebrity association 
The company has employed numerous well known models including Masuimi Max, Sophia Santi, Miki Black, Laura Lee,  Ashley Gates, Anya Monzikova, Dita Von Teese, Jennifer Lyons, Julie Strain and Bridget Silvestri. Singer Zayra Alvarez, a former contestant on the TV show Rock Star: Supernova, revealed that most of her shocking outfits come from Trashy Lingerie.

Trashy's clientele has included Vanity, Cher, Madonna, Mariah Carey, Janet Jackson, Kim Basinger, Dolly Parton, Gwyneth Paltrow, Drew Barrymore, Cameron Diaz, Sheryl Crow, Kate Bosworth, Jenny McCarthy, Anna Nicole Smith, Paris Hilton, Kylie Jenner, Arianna Grande, Katy Perry, Claudia Schiffer, Caitlyn Jenner and others.

The black Trashy Lingerie bustier worn by Madonna on the Who's That Girl World Tour was sold at auction by Julien's Auctions for £45,000 in 2011. It had previously been exhibited at the Rock and Roll Hall of Fame in Ohio and at the Frederick's Museum of Hollywood in Los Angeles.

References

External links
Official Website

Clothing retailers of the United States
Companies based in Los Angeles
Lingerie brands